Li Chuanguang (born 1961) is a lieutenant general in the People's Liberation Army of China. He was a representative of the 19th National Congress of the Chinese Communist Party. He is a member of the 19th Central Committee of the Chinese Communist Party.

Biography
Li was born in Qingzhou, Shandong, in 1961. He served in the PLA Second Artillery Corps for a long time.

In May 2016, he was promoted to become deputy commander of the People's Liberation Army Rocket Force, but having held the position for only two months. In August 2016, he became chief of staff of the force. In March 2018, he became deputy commander for the second time.

He was promoted to the rank of major general (shaojiang) in 2009 and lieutenant general (zhongjiang) in 2017.

References

1961 births
Living people
People from Qingzhou
People's Liberation Army generals from Shandong
Members of the 19th Central Committee of the Chinese Communist Party